Tammy Jenkins (born 26 August 1971 in Kawakawa, New Zealand) is a badminton player from New Zealand. She competed at the 1994 Commonwealth Games in Victoria, Canada. At the 1998 Commonwealth Games she won a bronze medal partnering Rhona Robertson in women's doubles. Four years later at the 2002 Commonwealth Games, she won another bronze medal in the mixed team.

Jenkins also represented New Zealand at the 1992 Summer Olympics in Barcelona, and the 1996 Summer Olympics in Atlanta, both in ladies' doubles with Rhona Robertson.

References 
 
 

1971 births
Living people
New Zealand female badminton players
Badminton players at the 1992 Summer Olympics
Olympic badminton players of New Zealand
Badminton players at the 1996 Summer Olympics
Commonwealth Games bronze medallists for New Zealand
Badminton players at the 1994 Commonwealth Games
Badminton players at the 1998 Commonwealth Games
Badminton players at the 2002 Commonwealth Games
Commonwealth Games medallists in badminton
Medallists at the 1998 Commonwealth Games
Medallists at the 2002 Commonwealth Games